The Tamil Mirror is a Tamil-language news website in Colombo, Sri Lanka. It is published by Wijeya Newspapers. Its sister newspapers are, The Daily Mirror, The Sunday Times, Lankadeepa and Daily FT.

See also
List of newspapers in Sri Lanka

Notes

External links
 Tamil Mirror official Website
 Daily Mirror official Website
 Sunday Times official Website
 Daily FT official Website

Sri Lankan news websites
Tamil-language mass media
Wijeya Newspapers
Mass media in Colombo